The Event is a 2010 American television series.

The Event may also refer to:

 The Event (2003 film)
 The Event (2015 film)
 The Event (Iranian TV program)

See also
 The Event Group
 Event (disambiguation)